is a city located in the southern part of Saga Prefecture on the island of Kyushu, Japan. As of February 28, 2017, the city has an estimated population of 30,159 and a population density of 270 persons per km². The total area is 112.10 km².

Geography
Kashima is located about 60 kilometers southwest of Saga City. It borders the Ariake Sea to the east and Nagasaki Prefecture to the southwest. The southern area contains the Tara Mountains and the northern area consists of open plains along the coast, and the city proper.
Mountains: Mount Kyōga (1076 m), Mount Jōdo (501 m), Mount Kotoji (501 m), Mount Gibi (198 m)
Rivers: Shiota River, Kashima River, Hama River, Naka River

Adjoining municipalities
Saga Prefecture
Ureshino
Shiroishi
Tara
Nagasaki Prefecture
Ōmura

History
1889-04-01 - The modern municipal system was established. The current city region consists of six villages (Minami-Kashima, Kita-Kashima, Hachihongi, Fureda, Nogomi and Nanaura; all from Fujitsu District).
1912-12-01 - Minami-Kashima Village became Minami-Kashima Town, and Kita-Kashima Village was renamed Kashima Village.
1918-08-03 - Hachihongi Village became Hama Town.
1954-04-01 - Kashima Town absorbed Hama Town, Kashima Village, Furueda Village and Nogomi Village to create Kashima City.
1955-03-01 - Part of Nanaura Village was incorporated into Kashima City, while the remaining portion was incorporated into Tara Town.

Education

High schools
Saga Prefectural Kashima High School
Saga Prefectural Kashima Vocational High School

Junior high schools
Tōbu Junior High School
Seibu Junior High School

Elementary schools
Kashima Elementary School
Nogomi Elementary School
Furueda Elementary School
Hama Elementary School
Kita-Kashima Elementary School
Nanaura Elementary School
Meirin Elementary School

Transportation

Air
The nearest airports are Saga Airport and Nagasaki Airport.

Rail
JR Kyushu
Nagasaki Main Line
Hizen-Kashima Station - Hizen-Hama Station - Hizen-Nanaura Station - Hizen-Iida Station 
(the main station is Hizen-Kashima)

Road
Expressways:
There are no expressways in Kashima. The closest interchange is the Ureshino Interchange.
National highways:
Route 207
Route 444
Route 498
Prefectural roads:
Saga Prefectural Route 41

Festivals
The Kashima Gatalympics is held every May in Hama-chō, a part of Kashima City. This event involves playing a variety of sports in the mudflats of the Ariake Sea.

Sport
The local football club is Saga LIXIL F.C., and competes in the Kyushu Football League. Formerly known as Kyushu INAX SC, it changed its name when INAX's parent company LIXIL took over. It's also a pun on the team being from Kashima, as LIXIL also sponsors 8-time Japanese champions Kashima Antlers (from the city in Ibaraki).

Tourism
Yūtoku Inari Shrine (祐徳稲荷神社), one of the three biggest and most famous Inari shrines in Japan. There is a bus from Hizen-Kashima Station to Yūtoku Inari Shrine.

Japanese liquor brewing street (肥前浜宿酒蔵通り),It is 15 minutes on foot for a way from Hizen-Hama Station.

Famous people from Kashima
YUKI, one half of the duo BENNIE K
Narimi Arimori, actress

References

External links

 Kashima City official website 
 The Kashima Gatalypic Official Website 

Cities in Saga Prefecture